This is a list of Royal Variety Performances, gala evenings held annually in the United Kingdom, which are attended by senior members of the British Royal Family. Initially, the reigning monarch(s) would attend the show but in more recent years, the senior members attending have alternated, with Queen Elizabeth II attending less and less frequently as her reign progressed.

Performances
Where no town or city is noted in the venue column in the following table, it means that the venue is situated in London.

1910s
Consumer broadcasting had yet to be invented.

1920s
All of the gala evenings in the 1920s were un-broadcast and had no main presenter.

1930s

1940s

1950s

1960s

1970s

1980s

1990s

2000s

2010s

2020s

References

External links
Official website
History of the Royal Variety Performances

Lists of guest appearances in television
British variety television shows
British music television series
Royalty-related lists
United Kingdom-related lists